Blomheller Station is a railway station in Aurland, Norway, on the Flåm Line. The station opened in 1942.

References
Bibliography

Notes

Railway stations on the Flåm Line
Railway stations in Aurland
Railway stations opened in 1942
1942 establishments in Norway